Rob Gittins is a British screenwriter and novelist. TV shows he has written for include EastEnders, Tiger Bay, The Bill, Casualty, and Emmerdale. Gittins is the longest-serving writer on EastEnders and in 2015 he received an Outstanding Achievement Award (off-screen) at the British Soap Awards. He has also written over twenty radio plays for BBC Radio 4, and a drama series, Losing Paradise, which won the Gold Drama Medal at the New York International Radio Festival. He has published five novels.

References

External links

British television writers
British soap opera writers
British radio writers
Year of birth missing (living people)
Living people